Tae is a language spoken in South Sulawesi, Indonesia. It belongs to the Austronesian language family and is one of the languages of the ten tribes that inhabit the Tana Luwu region of South Sulawesi. The Tae language is used by most of the inhabitants of the three regencies of Tana Luwu (Luwu Regency, North Luwu Regency, and East Luwu Regency), and the city of Palopo. Tae is part of the South Sulawesi group of languages. It is closely related to Toraja, and more distantly to Mandar, Massenrempulu, and Mamuju. Tae is used as a lingua franca from south of the border with Buriko Wajo Regency to Malili East Luwu Regency, as well as in Tana Toraja and Massenrempulu.

References

Languages of Sulawesi
South Sulawesi languages